Heinz Angermeyer (1909–1988) was a German film producer. Along with Kurt Hoffmann, he ran a production company Independent-Film.

Selected filmography
 Agatha, Stop That Murdering! (1960)
 Stage Fright (1960)
 Snow White and the Seven Jugglers (1962)
 Gripsholm Castle (1963)
 Love Has to Be Learned (1963)
 Praetorius (1965)
 The House in Karp Lane (1965)
 Liselotte of the Palatinate (1966)
 Rheinsberg (1967)
 Glorious Times at the Spessart Inn (1967)
 Morning's at Seven (1968)
 When Sweet Moonlight Is Sleeping in the Hills (1969)
 Red Sun (1970)
 The Clown (1976)
 Angels of Iron (1981)

References

Bibliography 
 Tim Bergfelder, Erica Carter & Deniz Göktürk. The German Cinema Book. BFI, 2002.

External links 
 

1909 births
1998 deaths
Film people from Saxony
German film producers
People from Leipzig (district)